Ashley Ann Field (born August 10, 1989) is a former American women's college basketball player in the Baylor University. She graduated in December 2011.

Field was born in Burnet, Texas. She graduated from Faith Academy. In the 2011–12 Baylor Lady Bears season, she won the NCAA championships.

Baylor statistics 

Source

References

External links 
Baylor profile

1989 births
American women's basketball players
Basketball players from Texas
Centers (basketball)
Living people
Baylor Bears women's basketball players
People from Burnet, Texas